The 2001 ELMS at Vallelunga was the sixth race of the 2001 European Le Mans Series season.  It took place at Autodromo di Vallelunga, Italy, on September 2, 2001.

Official results

Class winners in bold.

Statistics
 Pole Position - #9 Lanesra - 1:06.987
 Fastest Lap - #9 Lanesra - 1:08.207
 Distance - 441.414 km
 Average Speed - 160.385 km/h

External links
 Official Results
 World Sports Racing Prototypes - Race Results

Vallelunga
European Le Mans Series Vallelunga